Christmas Spirit may refer to:

 Christmas Spirit (Donna Summer album), 1994
 Christmas Spirit (Richard Marx album), 2012
 The Christmas Spirit, a 1963 album by Johnny Cash